Karnaphuli ( Kôrnophuli; also spelt Karnafuli), or Khawthlangtuipui (in Mizo, meaning "western river"), is the largest and most important river in Chattogram and the Chattogram Hill Tracts. Before the Padma, it was the fastest flowing river in Bangladesh. It is said to "represent the drainage system of the whole south-western part of Mizoram." Principal tributaries include the Kawrpui River or Thega River, Tuichawng River and Phairuang River. A large hydroelectric power plant using Karnaphuli river was built in the Kaptai region during the 1960s. The mouth of the river hosts the Port of Chattogram, the largest and busiest seaport of Bangladesh.

Etymology
The presence of Arab traders and merchants in the history of Chittagong led to many areas in Chittagong to have names of Arabic origin. The name of this river is thought to have come from qarnaful, the Arabic word for clove, and refers to an incident in which an Arab ship full of cloves sank in this river.

Chittagong City
Chittagong is situated on the banks of the Karnaphuli River between the Chittagong Hill Tracts and the Bay of Bengal.  The city is a noteworthy seaside seaport city and monetary focus in southeastern Bangladesh. The Chittagong Metropolitan Area has a populace of more than 8.9 million, making it the second biggest city in Bangladesh. It is the capital of an eponymous locale and division. A water treatment plant has been set up by Chittagong Port Authority to source water from the Karnaphuli river for its uses. The plant will make the port self-reliant in its water needs.

Tlabung
Tlabung is situated on the banks of the Karnaphuli River in Lunglei district, Mizoram. Karnaphuli River links Mizoram with the port cit of Chittagong on the shores of Bay of Bengal. British Troops and missionaries used this route to reach Mizoram during the Colonial days. It used to take 5 days to reach from Chittagong to Tlabung on a motorboat, a distance of about 90 kilometers after which they would travel another 35 kilometers to reach Lunglei.

Transportation

The Government has awarded a contract to build a two lane Karnaphuli tunnel underneath the Karnaphuli river to China Communication Construction Company (CCCC). This will be the first underwater tunnel in Bangladesh. CCCC will receive $706 million for its services with total costs expected to be over $1 billion.

Aquatic life
The river is home to Ganges river dolphin, which is an endangered species. Hilsa used to be common in the river, but have nearly disappeared from the river due to pollution.

Kaptai dam

The Kaptai Dam is the location of the Karnafuli Hydroelectric Power Station, constructed in Kaptai in 1962 and the only hydro-electric power plant in the country. An earth-filled dam on the Karnaphuli River, the Kaptai Dam created the Kaptai Lake, which acts as the water reservoir for the hydropower station. The power plant produces a total of 230 megawatts of electricity. When then east Pakistan built the dam, Indian Prime Minister Jawaharlal Nehru didn't object even though it resulted in part of Indian side getting submerged and inflow of more than 40000 refugees.

Pollution
Like many rivers in Bangladesh, Karnaphuli is heavily polluted by agricultural runoff. Reducing the amount of oxygen available and harming aquatic life in the river. In 2015, a train carrying oil crashed over a tributary of the river. The spill caused environmental degradation.

Gallery

See also
 List of rivers in Bangladesh

References

 
Rivers of Bangladesh
Rivers of Mizoram
Rivers of India
Rivers of Chittagong Division
International rivers of Asia